Cowichan-Ladysmith was a provincial electoral district for the Legislative Assembly of British Columbia, Canada.  It made its first appearance on the hustings in the general election of 1991, and was eliminated when the legislature dissolved in advance of the 2009 election.  Its predecessor riding was Cowichan-Malahat and was succeeded by Nanaimo-North Cowichan and Cowichan Valley.

Demographics

Election results 

|-

|-

|NDP
|Rob Hutchins
|align="right"|7,783
|align="right"|31.98%
|align="right"|
|align="right"|$26,172

|}

|-

|NDP
|Jan Pullinger
|align="right"|12,249
|align="right"|49.85%
|align="right"|
|align="right"|$32,625

|-

|}

|-

|NDP
|Jan Pullinger
|align="right"|11,038
|align="right"|48.53%
|align="right"|
|align="right"|$42,602
|-

|}

External links 
BC Stats Profile - 2001 (pdf)
Results of 2001 election (pdf)
2001 Expenditures (pdf)
Results of 1996 election
1996 Expenditures (pdf)
Results of 1991 election
1991 Expenditures
Website of the Legislative Assembly of British Columbia
 Imagine the Cowichan, part of Simon Fraser University's Imagine BC series

Former provincial electoral districts of British Columbia on Vancouver Island